This is a list of museums in Cameroon.

Museums in Cameroon 
 artBakery, near Douala
 Babungo Museum, Ndop
 Baham Museum
 Bandjoun Museum
 Blackitude Museum, Yaoundé
 doual'art
 Mankon Museum
 Mus'art Gallery, Kumbo
 Musée Afhemi, Yaoundé
 
 , Douala
 , Yaoundé
 Petit Musée d’Art Camerounais, Yaoundé

See also 
 List of museums

References

External links 
 http://www.museumcam.org

 
Cameroon
Museums
Cameroon
Museums